Never Forget Death is the twelfth studio album by power electronics band Whitehouse, released in September 1992 through Susan Lawly. The album is completely out-of-print, however all four of its tracks can be found on the special edition of Twice Is Not Enough.

For unknown reasons, the volume of "Torture Chamber" is mixed louder than that of the previous three tracks. The back cover of the record includes a warning to play the track at a low volume.

Track listing

Personnel
Whitehouse - production, music

References

1992 albums
Whitehouse (band) albums